Jonestown: Paradise Lost is a 2007 documentary television film on the History Channel about the final days of Jonestown, the Peoples Temple, and Jim Jones. From eyewitness and survivor accounts, the program recreates the last week before the mass murder-suicide on November 18, 1978.

Summary 
The film documents the final days of the Peoples Temple at Jonestown, Guyana.  Interspersed with interviews from survivors, dramatic recreations of the events show how Reverend Jim Jones becomes increasingly paranoid and erratic as pressures build on him, both inside the compound and from the United States.  When Congressman Leo Ryan insists on visiting, Jones alternates between reluctant acceptance and refusal.  Ultimately, Jones allows Ryan, several journalists, and the Concerned Relatives representatives to visit the compound.  Jones coaches the Peoples Temple members on what to say, but is surprised by a series of defections.  Jones orders the deaths of all involved and forces the members of the Temple to commit mass suicide.  Hyacinth Thrash, an elderly member, hides and survives.  Sherwin Harris, who never visited the compound itself, survives, but his estranged ex-wife, Sharon, and daughter, Lianne, both commit suicide.  Vernon Gosney and Tim Reiterman escape the assassination of Ryan, but both are shot and wounded by the assassins.  Stephan Jones, Jim Jones' son, was not at the compound during the massacre.

Cast 
 Ted Biggs (narrator)

Interviews 
 Stephan Jones, Jim Jones' son
 Vernon Gosney, former Peoples Temple member
 Tim Reiterman, journalist and author who was shot in Guyana
 Sherwin Harris, a member of the Concerned Relatives

Dramatic recreations 

 Rick Roberts as Jim Jones
 Quentin Krog as Stephan Jones
 Brendan Murray as Vernon Gosney
 Alon Nashman as Sherwin Harris
 Greg Ellwand  as Congressman Leo Ryan
 Kevin Otto as Tim Reiterman 
 Roxanne Blaise as Monica Bagby
 Cindi Sampson as Christine Miller
 Victoria Bartlett as Marceline Jones
 Nicole Crozier as Liane Harris
 Dean Slater as Don Harris
 Adrienne Pearce as Sharon Amos
 Patrick Lyster as Charles Garry
 Olive Cele as Hyacinth Thrash

Release 
Jonestown: Paradise Lost aired on the History Channel on January 15, 2007.  It was then shown at the Hot Docs Canadian International Documentary Festival on March 5, 2007, followed by its Canadian TV premiere on VisionTV on March 13, 2007.

Reception 
Ginia Bellafante of The New York Times wrote that the film "methodically clocks through the cult's final days", but Stephan Jones, Jim Jones' son, is "mesmerizing to watch".  Bellafante faults the documentary for not interviewing Stephan further.  Stephan has said that he has no intention of watching the documentary.

References

External links 
 

2007 documentary films
2007 television films
2007 films
Canadian documentary television films
English-language Canadian films
Films shot in South Africa
French documentary television films
Works about Jonestown
Leo Ryan
South African documentary films
Films set in Guyana
Cultural depictions of Jim Jones
Films about cults
2000s Canadian films
2000s French films